Aristolochia eriantha is a species of perennial plant in the family Aristolochiaceae. It is found in Bolivia.

References

External links

eriantha